Beelbangera is a town in the north west of the Riverina and situated about 2 kilometres north-east of Griffith and about 7 kilometres south-west of Yenda.  At the  Beelbangera had a population of 311.

The place name Beelbangera is derived from the local Aboriginal word meaning "native companion".

Beelbangera Post Office opened on 1 September 1919.

Notes and references

External links

Towns in the Riverina
Towns in New South Wales